OutSystems is a Low-code development platform which provides tools for companies to develop, deploy and manage omnichannel enterprise applications.

OutSystems was founded in 2001 in Lisbon, Portugal.

In June 2018 OutSystems secured a $360M round of funding from KKR and Goldman Sachs and reached the status of Unicorn.

In February 2021 OutSystems raised another $150M investment from a round co-led by Abdiel Capital and Tiger Global Management, having a total valuation of $9.5 Billion.

OutSystems is a member of the Consortium of IT Software Quality (CISQ).

Products 
OutSystems is a low-code development platform for the development of mobile and web enterprise applications, which run in the cloud, on-premises or in hybrid environments.

In 2014 OutSystems launched a free version of the platform that provides developers with personal cloud environments to create and deploy web and mobile applications without charge. The current version is 11.53, for both the paid and unpaid versions.

References

External links

Cloud computing providers
Cloud platforms
2001 establishments in Portugal
Low Code Application Platform